The Toyota Camry (XV20) is a mid-size car that was sold by Toyota between September 1996 and 2001 in Japan and North America, and 1997 and 2002 in Australia. Introduced on 3 September 1996, the XV20 series represented the fourth generation of the Toyota Camry in all markets outside Japan, which followed a different generational lineage. The XV20 Camry range is split into different model codes indicative of the engine. Inline-four models utilize the SXV20 (gasoline) and SXV23 (CNG) codes, with MCV20 designating the six-cylinder (V6) versions.

The XV20 Camry continued as a sedan and station wagon, though the latter model was not sold in North America, where the sedan was launched in 1996 for the 1997 model year. The XV20 Camry was offered in 2.2-liter inline-four and 3.0-liter V6 engined versions. In Australia, the luxury-oriented version was badged Toyota Vienta.

In Japan, an upmarket version of the wagon also sold as the Toyota Mark II Qualis. Furthermore, this was the first Camry to be badge-engineered as a Daihatsu; the Daihatsu Altis sold in Japan was identical to the export version of the Camry. In addition, the Vista's sheet metal resembled a tall, formal sedan, while the Camry became sleeker. The Lexus ES 300 was again built from the Windom, which uses the Camry chassis.

In August 1999 for the 2000 model year, the sedan models in North America received a mid-model upgrade to the front and rear fascias, this included larger headlights that now feature a four-bulb system instead of two, a separated grille with chrome surround, larger taillights, and larger body-side moldings. Toyota Australia started production of the facelift model in 2000.

Development 
As Japanese yen soared in the mid-1990s, the redesigned Camry had less content than the previous model under pressure to reduce costs. Following the debut of the XV10 in 1991, development immediately began under Kosaku Yamada under program code 415T. Styling ended with a winning design competition proposal "C" by Kawazu Masahiko being chosen in August 1993, 36 months ahead of scheduled production. The final XV20 design was frozen by early February 1994, at over 30 months ahead of scheduled production start in August 1996. Design patents were filed on 9 February 1994 at the Japan Patent Office and registered under #1057806. Prototypes were tested throughout 1995 and 1996.

Engines

Markets 
XV20 Camrys were manufactured in at the Tsutsumi plant in Toyota, Aichi, Japan; Toyota Australia's facility in Altona, Victoria; and at the Toyota Motor Manufacturing Kentucky production site in Georgetown, Kentucky, United States. Production in Thailand and Indonesia began in 1999, replacing Australia as the source of Camrys in Southeast Asia.

Japan 

The Japanese market XV20 arrived in December 1996 in both sedan and wagon body styles with a choice of a 2.2-liter four-cylinder or a 2.5-liter V6 engine with the only transmission choice being a 4-speed automatic. The wagon was also sold in Japan as Toyota Mark II Qualis. It had no relation to the Mark II sedan (a rear-wheel drive executive car) besides the front and rear lights, which resembled those of the Mark II. The Mark II Qualis was also available in a 3.0G version, with the 3.0-liter V6 engine, not available on the Japanese market Camry. The Camry was sold only at Toyota Japanese dealerships called Toyota Corolla Store alongside the Camry, while its twin the Mark II Qualis was exclusive to Toyopet Store locations.

An equivalent model was launched as the Daihatsu Altis. It was only sold in Japan, and its production started from this generation. The Altis was introduced March 2000 as a flagship sedan for Daihatsu as a replacement for the Daihatsu Applause. Not very many Altis models were sold in Japan. This is because a typical Daihatsu is priced in the entry level pricing range, and the Altis was priced very similar to the comparable model Camry. The Altis was available with the 2.2-liter four-cylinder engine. Unlike the Camry, which is available as a sedan or wagon in Japan, the Altis sold only as a sedan. The name "Altis" is a variation of the word "altitude", implying a "high elevation" status as the top-level car for Daihatsu.

Australasia 

In Australia, unlike the previous generation, the Camry name was also applied to the V6 variants, while the Toyota Vienta V6 range was revised as the "upmarket" models. The line-up of four-cylinder Camry models consisted of the CSi, Conquest and CSX models (automatic transmission was standard on Conquest and CSX); all three variants were available in sedan or wagon body styles. The Camry V6 models consisted of CSi and Conquest, again as sedans and wagons, with the wagons only available with automatic transmission. The Camry V6 Touring sedan model was launched in March 1999.

The Vienta V6 line up consisted of VXi and Grande sedans and the VXi wagon. The Vienta VXi was similarly equipped to the four-cylinder Camry CSX.

In September 2000, the revised Camry was launched. The Vienta V6 range was discontinued due to the launch of the Avalon sedan in July 2000 and two new models were added to the Camry range: the top-of-the-range Azura V6 sedan and the Touring V6 wagon, both of which were available with an automatic transmission only. Towards the end of the model run, the limited edition Intrigue and Advantage sedans were launched.

Wheel sizes vary on this shape of Camry, with some using 14-inch wheels, while others use 15-inch.

New Zealand made a special edition of 10, TRD supercharged, 3.0 V6, 5 speed manual sedans called the Camry TS Supercharged. It produced 206 kW over the standard V6. This vehicle was a special edition put together by Toyota NZ. The suspension was tuned by former F1 driver Chris Amon and featured TS emblems on the cluster and on the leather seats. Amon also has input on many other Toyotas for the New Zealand market including the Corona and Corolla.

Middle East 
For the Middle East market, the Camry was sourced from Australia. It was offered in three different trims as a sedan: the low-end XLI and mid-range GLI that both carried the four-cylinder engine—and the luxury Grande with V6 engine. The station wagon was also offered with the GLI trim.

North America 

In the United States, the Camry SE was dropped and the base model was renamed the CE for the 1997 model year. Both the LE and the XLE trims were carried over from the previous generation. All trim levels were available with either the 2.2-liter inline-four or the 3.0-liter V6 engine. The LE-based Gallery Edition and Collector Edition were new for 2001 model year. Some of this generation Camry sold in the US were produced at TMMK as well as at the Tsutsumi plant in Japan. A Camry manufactured in Japan is denoted with a VIN starting with "JT2"; US-made models are denoted with a VIN starting with "4T1".

Manual transmissions were only available on the CE and LE V6 models.

The Camry had a mild refresh in August 1999 for the 2000 model year.

A coupe was added in 1998 for the 1999 model year, and then a convertible form in 1999 for the 2000 model year. In contrast to the coupe from the third-generation Camrys, the new two-door cars were given a separate nameplate Toyota Camry Solara, or simply Solara. They were also a significant styling departure from the sedan. The Solara was available in SE and SLE trims, corresponding roughly to the sedan's LE and XLE trims.

Toyota, in 1999, offered a four-cylinder, non-hybrid CNG-powered XV20 Camry in California to fleet customers.

The Camry V6 was again on Car and Driver magazine's Ten Best list for 1997.

The Insurance Institute for Highway Safety gave the Camry a "Good" overall score in their frontal offset crash test. Front seat-mounted side torso airbags were optional beginning on 1999 models.

Europe 
The XV20 was also sold in Europe. But like its predecessor, the Camry XV10, the range was a lot more limited. As before, models for the European market continued to be imported from Japan.

Launched in 1997, the range consisted the 2.2i GL and 3.0i GX models in sedan form only. Like the Camry XV10, the GX was only available with an automatic transmission. The 2.2i GL was available with both manual and automatic transmissions.

The Camry received a four out of five star safety rating in Euro NCAP's test, due to its side airbags.

References

External links 
 

Euro NCAP executive cars
XV20
Cars introduced in 1996
2000s cars
Motor vehicles manufactured in the United States